Mira Monte (Spanish for "Mountain View") is a rural community in Ventura County, California, United States. Mira Monte is located in between the communities of Oak View, Meiners Oaks, and southwest of the City of Ojai, California. For statistical purposes, the United States Census Bureau has defined Mira Monte as a census-designated place (CDP). The census definition of the area may not precisely correspond to local understanding of the area with the same name. According to the 2020 census, the population of Mira Monte is 6,618, down from 6,845 at the 2010 census.

Geography
The Ventura River forms the western boundary of the community with the base of Sulfur mountain running along the east boundary. California State Route 33 and Route 150 bisect the community. Mira Monte was served by the Ventura and Ojai Valley Railroad from 1898 to 1969.

Education
Mira Monte is served by the Ojai Unified School District. There is one public school within the town, Mira Monte Elementary School.

Demographics

2010
The 2010 United States Census reported that Mira Monte had a population of 6,854. The racial makeup of Mira Monte was 5,989 (87.4%) White, 43 (0.6%) African American, 61 (0.9%) Native American, 129 (1.9%) Asian, 3 (0.0%) Pacific Islander, 406 (5.9%) from other races, and 223 (3.3%) from two or more races. Hispanic or Latino of any race were 1,254 persons (18.3%).

The Census reported that 6,824 people (99.6% of the population) lived in households, 30 (0.4%) lived in non-institutionalized group quarters, and 0 (0%) were institutionalized.

There were 2,800 households, out of which 742 (26.5%) had children under the age of 18 living in them, 1,436 (51.3%) were opposite-sex married couples living together, 274 (9.8%) had a female householder with no husband present, 130 (4.6%) had a male householder with no wife present.  There were 115 (4.1%) unmarried opposite-sex partnerships, and 22 (0.8%) same-sex married couples or partnerships. 792 households (28.3%) were made up of individuals, and 439 (15.7%) had someone living alone who was 65 years of age or older. The average household size was 2.44.  There were 1,840 families (65.7% of all households); the average family size was 2.97.

The population was spread out, with 1,330 people (19.4%) under the age of 18, 488 people (7.1%) aged 18 to 24, 1,286 people (18.8%) aged 25 to 44, 2,301 people (33.6%) aged 45 to 64, and 1,449 people (21.1%) who were 65 years of age or older.  The median age was 48.0 years. For every 100 females, there were 93.2 males.  For every 100 females age 18 and over, there were 90.0 males.

The homeowner vacancy rate was 2.2%; the rental vacancy rate was 4.0%.  5,338 people (77.9% of the population) lived in owner-occupied housing units and 1,486 people (21.7%) lived in rental housing units.

2000
As of the census of 2000, there were 7,177 people, 2,619 households, and 1,893 families residing in the CDP. The racial makeup of the CDP was 89.37% White, 0.53% African American, 0.78% Native American, 1.14% Asian, 0.08% Pacific Islander, 5.02% from other races, and 3.08% from two or more races. Hispanic or Latino of any race were 13.25% of the population.

There were 2,619 households, out of which 33.4% had children under the age of 18 living with them, 59.3% were married couples living together, 9.7% had a female householder with no husband present, and 27.7% were non-families. 22.5% of all households were made up of individuals, and 11.4% had someone living alone who was 65 years of age or older.  The average household size was 2.65 and the average family size was 3.11.

In the CDP, the population was spread out, with 25.2% under the age of 18, 6.8% from 18 to 24, 25.7% from 25 to 44, 27.3% from 45 to 64, and 15.0% who were 65 years of age or older.  The median age was 41 years. For every 100 females, there were 91.2 males.  For every 100 females age 18 and over, there were 86.2 males.

The median income for a household in the CDP was $55,377, and the median income for a family was $62,083. Males had a median income of $49,931 versus $36,201 for females. The per capita income for the CDP was $25,393.  About 3.6% of families and 6.2% of the population were below the poverty line, including 6.2% of those under age 18 and 1.7% of those age 65 or over.

References

Census-designated places in Ventura County, California
Census-designated places in California